Irish wine production takes place in a small number of vineyards and wine producers the majority of which lie in County Cork, Ireland, with Lusk, North County Dublin, also producing a wine named  'Lusca'. Ireland is officially listed as a wine producing country by the European Commission. Ballydrehid House Estate (in Cahir, County Tipperary), Blackwater Valley Vineyard (Mallow), The Watergrasshill Vineyard (Bartlemy), Longueville House (Mallow), West Waterford Vineyard (Cappoquin, Co. Waterford)  and the most southern and longest standing Thomas Walk Vineyard (Kinsale) all produce wine despite being well north of the area where the  Vitis vinifera commonly occurs.

History
The facts surrounding Ireland's early wine production are unsettled. Bede wrote in his AD 731 Ecclesiastical History of the English People that there was not "any want of vines" in Ireland. However, Gerald of Wales wrote in the 12th century that Ireland did not have vines and Bede's claim was inaccurate. Modern wine writer Susan Boyle, meanwhile, argues that wine-stained pottery found at archaeological sites serves as evidence that the ancient Celts introduced wine to Ireland about 500 years before Christ was born.

There are records of previous attempts to cultivate the vine for wine production, such as in the 5th century, when monks at the (later Cistercian) monastery in County Kilkenny planted a vineyard, with a number of other monastic communities following and also producing wine.

Irish Berry wines
In addition to grapes, berries are also used to create wines in Ireland. Typically berries were harvested from hedgerows for this purpose.

See also
Wine from the United Kingdom

References

Links
 Bunratty Winery
Móinéir Winery
Thomas Walk Vineyard

Wine
Wine by country